Philip Matthew Pinnell (born August 15, 1979) is an American politician serving as the 17th lieutenant governor of Oklahoma, since 2019. Pinnell is also serving as the first Oklahoma Secretary of Tourism & Branding. Pinnell is a member of the Republican Party.

Early life and career
Pinnell graduated from Metro Christian Academy in Tulsa, Oklahoma, and Oral Roberts University. He served as chairman of the Oklahoma Republican Party from 2010 to 2013. He then worked for the Republican National Committee as the National State Party Director. Pinnell also worked on a campaign for former Oklahoma Attorney General Scott Pruitt.

Lieutenant Governor of Oklahoma 
On April 20, 2017, Pinnell announced his candidacy for the office of lieutenant governor. On June 26, 2018, Pinnell finished in the top two in the Republican primary election, and he and Dana Murphy advanced to a runoff election, in which Pinnell defeated Murphy. Pinnell defeated Democratic candidate Anastasia Pittman in the lieutenant gubernatorial election on November 6. Pinnell was sworn in on January 14, 2019.

On January 18, 2019, Governor Kevin Stitt selected Pinnell to serve as the first Oklahoma Secretary of Tourism and Branding, wherein he oversees the Oklahoma Department of Tourism and Recreation. Stitt separated the departments of Tourism and Commerce to be their own stand-alone agencies.

Personal life
Pinnell and his wife, Lisa, have four children.

References

External links

1979 births
Lieutenant Governors of Oklahoma
Living people
21st-century American politicians
Oklahoma Republican Party chairs
Oral Roberts University alumni
Politicians from Enid, Oklahoma
Political campaign staff